State Route 67 (SR 67) is a primary state highway in the southwest part of the U.S. state of Virginia. It runs from SR 80 near Honaker east to U.S. Route 460 (US 460) at Raven, east concurrently with US 460 and US 460 Business (US 460 Bus.) into downtown Richlands, and north to SR 616 at Jewell Ridge on the Tazewell–Buchanan county line.

Route description

SR 67 begins at SR 80 east of the town of Honaker in Russell County. From there it heads in a general northeasterly direction to the Clinch River at Gardner. SR 67 follows the Clinch River to the settlement of Swords Creek and then heads north next to Swords Creek to Dye. There it curved gradually east along a smaller creek, crosses a summit, and runs alongside other creeks to the county line at West Raven.

Upon entering Tazewell County, SR 67 again parallels the Clinch River at Raven, following an old alignment of US 460 to Doran. It then heads east on US 460 and US 460 Bus. into downtown Richlands. SR 67 leaves Richlands to the north, running alongside Big Creek past Seaboard and Coaldan to near Jewell Ridge, rising onto Smith Ridge (the Tennessee Valley Divide) and ending at SR 616 at the Buchanan County line. SR 616 runs along the county line at the top of the ridge.

History
An initial  piece north from SR 126 (now US 460 Business) in Richlands was added to the state highway system in 1931 as State Route 138, and a further 4.11 miles (6.61 km) was added in 1932. The road was renumbered State Route 83 in the 1933 renumbering, and the rest of current SR 67 was numbered State Route 619. In 1937, the road north to Jewell Ridge was transferred to the primary system.

The gap in SR 83 was filled in 1938, transferring some of SR 617 to the primary system. (A short piece of SR 617 from SR 83 to SR 632 still remains, as does a much larger piece of Tazewell County's SR 617.)

In the 1940 renumbering, SR 83 was renumbered SR 67, as the number 83 was needed for its current alignment, matching West Virginia Route 83.

Major intersections

References

External links

Virginia Highways Project: VA 67

067
State Route 067
State Route 067